Octeract Engine is a proprietary massively parallel deterministic global optimization solver for general Mixed-Integer Nonlinear Programs (MINLP). It uses MPI as a means of accelerating solution times. It is notable for its parallelism and for ranking ahead of all other global MINLP solvers in the Mittelmann MINLP benchmark. As of January 2023, it is also the first solver to ever solve 99% of problems in this benchmark.

History
Octeract Engine was developed by Nikos Kazazakis and Gabriel Lau. The first public beta version of Octeract Engine was released in August 2019 and it came out of beta in August 2020.

Performance
Octeract Engine exhibits world-class performance on a single thread, and also has the ability to speed up these single thread solution times by many times through supercomputing.

In July 2022 it ranked first on the single thread Mittelmann MINLPLIB benchmark. As of January 2023 this benchmark is run with four threads.

As of August 2022 it is the first and only solver to solve the largest open transmission switching problems in the industry standard MINLPLIB library, namely transswitch2736spp
and transswitch2736spr. 

In January 2023, it became the first solver to ever solve 99% of problems in this benchmark, followed by BARON (84%), and SCIP (74%).

Features
Octeract Engine is predominantly a branch-and-bound solver, although it has been known to use other specialized techniques to exploit special structure, such as the Sherali-Smith reformulation. Some of its features are: 

 Distributed computing through MPI
 Supports discontinuous elementary functions (e.g.  and )
 Supports trigonometric functions
 Guarantees global optimality
 Reformulation of user input
 Detection of special structure
 Guaranteed calculations through interval arithmetic and arbitrary-precision arithmetic

Supported problem types

File formats
Octeract Engine can read and write .nl, .lp and .mps files.

Interfaces
Octeract Engine can be run directly or invoked as a C++ library. It supports the following modelling languages:

 AMPL
 ASL
 GAMS
 JuMP
 Pyomo

The engine also interfaces to the following solvers:

 CPLEX
 CBC
 CLP
 IPOPT

Limitations
Like all deterministic global optimization software, Octeract Engine requires the explicit mathematical expressions for all functions used in the problem.

See also 
 ANTIGONE
 BARON
 Couenne
 AMPL
 GAMS

References

Mathematical optimization software